The 2015 TCR International Series Valencia round was the third round of the 2015 TCR International Series season. It took place on 3 May at the Circuit Ricardo Tormo.

Pepe Oriola won the first race, starting from pole position, and Stefano Comini gained the second one, both driving a SEAT León Cup Racer.

Success Ballast
Due to the results obtained in the previous round, Gianni Morbidelli received +30 kg, Andrea Belicchi +20 kg and Stefano Comini +10 kg.

Classification

Qualifying

Race 1

Race 2

Notes:
 — David Cebrián and Jordi Oriola were moved to the back of the grid because of a parc fermé infringement.
 — Andrea Belicchi was disqualified for not have served a drive through penalty.

Standings after the event

Drivers' Championship standings

Teams' Championship standings

 Note: Only the top five positions are included for both sets of drivers' standings.

References

External links
TCR International Series official website

Valencia
TCR International Series